Tyrone R. Lamont (born 3 April 1985 in Durban) is a South African baseball pitcher. He played in the 2006 World Baseball Classic with the South Africa national baseball team. In 2003, Lamont signed as an undrafted free agent with the Seattle Mariners organization. In 2004 and 2005, Lamont pitched for the Arizona League Mariners.

References

External links

1985 births
Living people
Arizona League Mariners players
Baseball pitchers
South African expatriate baseball players in the United States
Sportspeople from Durban
2006 World Baseball Classic players